Beminitiya Seya, also known as the Great Famine,

(103-89 BC), during the reign of King Vattagamini Abhaya, known as Valagambahu, was a period of over a decade in which ancient Sri Lanka's irrigation systems failed as a result of invasion, corruption and neglect.

It was a time of hardship, compounded by foreign invasion, making this a grey region of Sri Lanka's history. Long drought coupled with South Indian invasion completely neglected the repairs and maintenance of the advanced irrigation systems that was in place. The situation eased with the deaths of five warring princes and the return of King Valagambahu. As soon as Valagambahu took over power in 89 BC, work was done to repair and reconstruct the ill-fated irrigation system which saw the end of the baminitiya seya in 89 BC. Valagambahu is regarded as one of Sri Lanka's greatest heroes.

The famine is mentioned a number of times in the stories contained in "Sihalavatthu Pakarana", the oldest work of Ceylonese literature. It is related that at this time many monks left the island for India or the Maldives.

See also
 Abhayagiri Dagaba

References

Anuradhapura period